On-call, or on-call scheduling, is a type of employee work schedule.

On Call may also refer to:

 "On Call" (song), a 2007 song by Kings of Leon
 On Call, a 1974 novel by Elizabeth Harrison (writer)
 On Call: Serbisyong Totoo. Ngayon., a Philippine public service TV program
 "On Call" (Casualty), a 2015 webisode of the BBC medical drama

See also
 On-call room, a room in a hospital for staff rest
 DART On-Call, a premium shuttle service by Dallas Area Rapid Transit